King of Swords is a card used in Latin suited playing cards which include tarot decks. It is part of what tarot card readers call the "Minor Arcana".

Tarot cards are used throughout much of Europe to play Tarot card games.

In English-speaking countries, where the games are largely unknown, Tarot cards came to be utilized primarily for divinatory purposes.

Divination usage
The King of Swords card from the Minor Arcana is often used to depict a mature man with sound intellectual understanding and reasoning. This card depicts a man who is strong-hearted, decisive, and intellectually oriented. 

The King of Swords can also depict a man who is ruthless or excessively  judgmental; the querent is therefore advised to balance their intellectual orientation with emotional understanding.

References

Fictional kings
Suit of Swords